William Deering (born July 20, 1971) is an American former athlete who specialized in the pole vault.

Deering, a Michigan native, learned pole vault from his father William Sr, a two-time state high school champion. They had a pole vault pit in their yard that he could practice in, using a pole his father had made out of sassafras trees. He attended the University of Miami, where he was an NCAA All-American twice and won five Big East Conference championships. In 1995 he claimed a silver medal for the U.S. at the Pan American Games in Mar del Plata. He was also a finalist at the 1997 IAAF World Indoor Championships and finished fourth at the 1998 Goodwill Games.

References

External links

1971 births
Living people
American male pole vaulters
Track and field athletes from Michigan
Miami Hurricanes athletes
Competitors at the 1998 Goodwill Games
Athletes (track and field) at the 1995 Pan American Games
Medalists at the 1995 Pan American Games
Pan American Games silver medalists for the United States
Pan American Games medalists in athletics (track and field)
20th-century American people
21st-century American people